CBS-FM may refer to:

 WCBS-FM
 KCBS-FM
 CBS FM Buganda, a radio station in Uganda